Antigua and Barbuda competed at the 1984 Summer Olympics in Los Angeles, United States.  The nation returned to the Olympic Games after participating in the American-led boycott of the 1980 Summer Olympics. Fourteen competitors, ten men and four women, took part in seventeen events in three sports.

Athletics

Men
Track & road events

Field events

Women
Track & road events

Cycling

Three cyclists represented Antigua and Barbuda in 1984.

Track
1000m time trial

Men's Sprint

Omnium

Sailing

Men

See also
Antigua and Barbuda at the 1983 Pan American Games

References

External links
Official Olympic Reports

Nations at the 1984 Summer Olympics
1984
Olympics